The 1911 Baltimore mayoral election saw the election of James H. Preston.

Nominations
Incumbent Democratic mayor J. Barry Mahool lost reelection in the Democratic primary to James H. Preston.

Former mayor E. Clay Timanus won the Republican nomination.

General election
The general election was held May 2.

References

Baltimore mayoral
Mayoral elections in Baltimore
Baltimore